Pawan Raj Goyal is an Indian pulmonologist who gained his post graduate degree from Harvard Medical School, Boston. The Government of India honoured him, in 2014, with the award of Padma Shri, the fourth highest civilian award, for his contributions to the fields of medicine.

Biography
Pawan Raj Goyal, hailing from Haryana, graduated in medicine from Maulana Azad Medical College, New Delhi in 1974 and did his residency at the Irwin Hospital, New Delhi. He has worked in various hospitals and institutions including SRM Medical College Hospital and Research Centre, Chennai as the Professor and the Head of the Department of chest and pulmonary medicine where he holds the status of professor emeritus.

Besides being the Chairman and Managing Director of PRG Medicares and Researches Limited, he also heads Osho Ceramics, a commercial entity manufacturing tableware, since 1990. He is a recipient of Udyog Gaurav and Samaj Shri awards.

References

External links
 

Living people
Recipients of the Padma Shri in medicine
20th-century Indian medical doctors
1952 births
Scientists from Ahmedabad
Medical doctors from Gujarat
Indian pulmonologists